Stonecroft may refer to:

in Canada
Stonecroft, Niverville, Manitoba, a development

in the United States
Stonecroft (Birmingham, Alabama), listed on the National Register of Historic Places in Birmingham, Alabama
Shubel Smith House, Ledyard, Connecticut, known also as Stonecroft, listed on the National Register of Historic Places, in New London County
Stonecroft Homes LLC (Louisville, KY), A Southern Living Custom Builder Member since 2008

See also
Stonecroft Ministries